Pinki Pramanik (born 10 April 1986 in Purulia) is an Indian track and field athlete who specialises in the 400 metres and 800 metres. Pramanik had success with the national 4×400 metres relay team, winning silver at the 2006 Commonwealth Games, gold at the 2006 Asian Games, and gold at the 2005 Asian Indoor Games. She won three gold medals at the 2006 South Asian Games, winning the 400 and 800 m events, as well as the relay.

Her first success was winning two bronze medals at the Asian Indoor Athletics Championships when she was 17 years old. She was chosen to represent Asia at the IAAF World Cup. Domestically, she has won three times at the All-India Open National Championships. A series of injuries and a car crash meant that she rarely competed after 2007.

Career
Pramanik made her mark at junior level when she set four junior state records in 2002. she made her world debut at the 2003 World Youth Championships in Athletics where she reached the 800 m semifinals. she won the 400 m race at the All-India Open National Championships soon after. she set a record at the National Junior Athletics meeting by running 54.92 seconds in the 400 m, although some confusion over whether she was born in 1986 or 1987 dampened proceedings.

International medals
She stepped up to the senior level the following year and won two bronzes in the 400 m and 800 m races at the 2004 Asian Indoor Athletics Championships. In late 2004, an incident in which a group of youths planted a gun on her and called police put her career at risk. However, eyewitnesses testified that the youths had harassed her and had placed the gun in her bag; she was released without charge. She took three months off from competition to recover from the stress of the incident.

Another medal came indoors when she took gold as part of the 4×400 metres relay team at the 2005 Asian Indoor Games with Iyleen Samantha, Santhi Soundarajan, and Mandeep Kaur. She returned to compete at the All-India Open National Championships, and came away with 400 and 800 m golds. The 2006 Commonwealth Games was her first appearance at the world senior level and she performed well, reaching the 800 m semi-finals and recording a personal best of  2:03.83, and winning a silver medal for India with Rajwinder Kaur, Chitra Soman, and Manjeet Kaur in the 4×400 m relay.

At Bangalore's Asian Grand Prix meeting in May that year she won the 800 m and improved her 400 m personal best, winning in 52.46 seconds. A few months later she marked herself out as one of the region's best runners at the 2006 South Asian Games: she won the 400 and 800 m gold medals and headed the relay team for a third gold. However, she was disappointed that she had not improved her time and said that she expected greater competition from the Sri Lankan athletes.

She was selected to represent her continent at the 2006 IAAF World Cup and finished in seventh place for Asia in the 800 m race. She attended her first Asian Games later that year, competing the 400 m and the relay. She reached the individual final, but just missed out on medal, finishing two hundredths of a second behind Japan's Asami Tanno. Greater success came in the relay: running with Sathi Geetha, Chitra Soman and Manjeet Kaur, the women's team took India's only athletics gold of Games.

Injuries
A severe foot injury caused Pramanik to miss much of the 2007 season. She had returned to fitness by August and began competing at regional meeting and recorded 11.07 seconds in the 100 metres in Kolkata. She set her sights on winning at the 2008 Indian Inter-State championships in order to qualify for the 2008 Summer Olympics. However, she was struck by injury again and missed the championships due to a hamstring problem.

In early 2010 Pramanik inaugurated a local competition, the Purulia Athletic Championship. On the way home, she collided with another vehicle and suffered deep cuts to her face and knees. Although her condition was not serious, she suffered from much back pain and remained in hospital for further treatment.

Doping 
In a 2012 interview, Pramanik related that her coaches required her to have regular injections of testosterone, to improve her performance.

Sex controversy
In 2012 a rape allegation by Pramanik's female friend led to medical tests to determine her gender. Initial private tests claimed to show her to be male. Pramanik disagreed with these results and police ordered a separate government-led test as part of the trial. The results at the SSKM Government Hospital were inconclusive. The Court then directed a chromosome pattern test. In November 2012, the further medical tests were reported showing Pinki is a "male pseudo-hermaphrodite".
However the medical report has revealed that Pramanik is incapable of having penetrative sex.

In response to allegation of rape and gender representation she said in an interview "The girl who brought these allegations was not my partner and we were not in love. She used to live next door on rent with her lover and her five-year-old child.  She had taken nude photographs of me and was threatening to make them public. She had been blackmailing me for some time. But to be accused of being male and raping her shocked me. I am not male. I have always been female. I look more male now because, as part of my training to compete in international athletics, I used to be regularly administered testosterone injections like other female participants. I was told that it was necessary to take these and I never questioned whether these were legal or not. I was focused on winning and did whatever I was asked to do by my trainers, who knew what was best for me. But after that, my voice became deeper and I grew more body hair."
She also said that she was manhandled and kept in a men's cell in jail. According to her, she did not consent to any testing, and was drugged and unconscious for the examination.

Claims were made that Avatar Singh, a power broker and husband of Jyotirmoyee Sikdar, one of Bengal's most celebrated athletes and a former CPM MP had been behind an attempt to frame her, in relation to an ongoing dispute regarding land (awarded to her by the West Bengal government for her superlative performance at the South Asian and Asian games in 2006).

In popular culture
Pinky - Ek Satyakatha (Pinky - A True Story) is a 2014 Indian Marathi-language drama film by Sudhin Thakur based on Pramanik's life with Sara Shravan in the titular role. It seeks to highlight the negative aspects of gender testing in sports.

Rashmi Rocket, a 2021 Indian sports drama film also based on the issue of gender testing was inspired by several athletes who have gone through the ordeal including Pramanik and Dutee Chand.

Personal bests 

 All information taken from IAAF profile.

References

Living people
1986 births
People from Purulia district
Sportswomen from West Bengal
Athletes from West Bengal
Indian female sprinters
Indian female middle-distance runners
21st-century Indian women
21st-century Indian people
Intersex sportspeople
Intersex women
Commonwealth Games silver medallists for India
Commonwealth Games medallists in athletics
Athletes (track and field) at the 2006 Commonwealth Games
Asian Games gold medalists for India
Asian Games medalists in athletics (track and field)
Athletes (track and field) at the 2006 Asian Games
Medalists at the 2006 Asian Games
South Asian Games gold medalists for India
Sex verification in sports
Indian LGBT sportspeople
LGBT track and field athletes
South Asian Games medalists in athletics
Medallists at the 2006 Commonwealth Games